Olearia newbeyi is a species of flowering plant in the family Asteraceae and is endemic to the south-west of Western Australia. It is a shrub with broadly linear to narrowly oblong leaves, and dull purple, daisy-like inflorescences.

Description
Both sides of the leaves are medium green with a few glandular hairs and a heart-shaped base.

Taxonomy
Olearia newbeyi was first formally described in 2008 by Nicholas Sèan Lander in the journal Nuytsia from specimens collected by Kenneth Newbey in 1985. The specific epithet (newbeyi) honours the collector of the type specimens.

Distribution and habitat
This daisy bush grows in shrubland on a disturbed roadside and is only known from a single collection in the Mallee bioregion of south-western Western Australia.

Conservation status
Olearia newbeyi is listed as "Priority One" by the Government of Western Australia Department of Biodiversity, Conservation and Attractions, meaning that it is known from only one or a few locations which are potentially at risk.

References

newbeyi
Flora of Western Australia
Plants described in 2008